The National Film Registry (NFR) is the United States National Film Preservation Board's (NFPB) collection of films selected for preservation, each selected for its historical, cultural and aesthetic contributions since the NFPB’s inception in 1988.

History 
Through the 1980s, several prominent filmmakers and industry personalities in the United States, such as Frank Capra and Martin Scorsese, advocated for Congress to enact a film preservation bill in order to avoid commercial modifications (such as pan and scan and editing for TV) of classic films, which they saw as negative. In response to the controversy over the colorization of originally black and white films in the decade specifically, Representatives Robert J. Mrazek and Sidney R. Yates introduced the National Film Preservation Act of 1988, which established the National Film Registry, its purpose, and the criteria for selecting films for preservation. The Act was passed and the NFR's mission was subsequently reauthorized by further acts of Congress in 1992, 1996, 2005, 2008, and 2016. The National Film Preservation Board's mission, to which the NFR contributes, is to ensure the survival, conservation, and increased public availability of America's film heritage. The 1996 law also created the non-profit National Film Preservation Foundation which, although affiliated with the NFPB, raises money from the private sector.

Selection criteria 

The NFPB adds to the NFR up to 25 "culturally, historically or aesthetically significant films" each year, showcasing the range and diversity of American film heritage to increase awareness for its preservation. A film becomes eligible for inclusion ten years after its original release. For the first selection in 1989, the public nominated almost 1,000 films for consideration. Members of the NFPB then developed individual ballots of possible films for inclusion. The ballots were tabulated into a list of 25 films which was then modified by Librarian of Congress James H. Billington and his staff at the Library for the final selection. Since 1997, members of the public have been able to nominate up to 50 films a year for the NFPB and Librarian to consider.

The NFR includes films ranging from Hollywood classics to orphan films. A film is not required to be feature-length, nor is it required to have been theatrically released in the traditional sense. The Registry contains newsreels, silent films, student films, experimental films, short films, music videos, films out of copyright protection or in the public domain, film serials, home movies, documentaries, animation, and independent films. As of the 2022 listing, there are 850 films in the Registry.

Films

Notes

± Indicates that a significant piece of music featured in the film's soundtrack is also a National Recording Registry inductee.
≠ Indicates that an excerpt of said inductee also appeared on a compilation film that was inducted into the Registry as well (in the cases of The Atomic Cafe, A Movie and Precious Images)

Number of films by release year
As of the 2022 induction there are 850 total films. For purposes of this list, multi-year serials are counted only once (as they are in the Registry) by year of completion.

Age of Registry selections
The oldest film in the registry, Newark Athlete, was released in 1891, while the most recent, Pariah, was released in 2011.

Timespan from release to selection
Released in 1898, and selected in December 2022, Mardi Gras Carnival experienced the longest wait, at 124 years, while Raging Bull, released theatrically in the United States on December 19, 1980, and inducted in October 1990, holds the record for the shortest delay, having been inducted slightly shy of the 10-year minimum. Only six other films have been inducted at the 10-year mark: Do the Right Thing, Goodfellas, Toy Story, Fargo, 13 Lakes, and Freedom Riders.

Directors with multiple entries (2 or more)
11
John Ford: The Iron Horse, The Informer, Stagecoach, Young Mr. Lincoln, The Grapes of Wrath, How Green Was My Valley, My Darling Clementine, The Quiet Man, The Searchers, The Man Who Shot Liberty Valance, How the West Was Won (segment)
10
Howard Hawks: Scarface, Twentieth Century, Bringing Up Baby, Only Angels Have Wings, His Girl Friday, Sergeant York, Ball of Fire, The Big Sleep, Red River, Rio Bravo
William Wyler: Dodsworth, Jezebel, Wuthering Heights, Mrs. Miniver, Memphis Belle, The Best Years of Our Lives, The Heiress, Roman Holiday, Ben-Hur, Funny Girl
9
George Cukor: Gone with the Wind (uncredited), The Prisoner of Zenda (uncredited), The Women, The Philadelphia Story, Gaslight, Adam's Rib, Born Yesterday, A Star Is Born, My Fair Lady
 Alfred Hitchcock: Rebecca, Shadow of a Doubt, Notorious, Strangers on a Train, Rear Window, Vertigo, North by Northwest, Psycho, The Birds
Leo McCarey: Mighty Like a Moose, Pass the Gravy (supervising director), The Battle of the Century, Big Business (supervising director), Duck Soup, Ruggles of Red Gap, Make Way for Tomorrow, The Awful Truth, Going My Way
8
Elia Kazan: A Tree Grows in Brooklyn, Gentleman's Agreement, A Streetcar Named Desire, On the Waterfront, East of Eden, A Face in the Crowd, Wild River, America America
7
Frank Capra: The Strong Man, The Power of the Press, It Happened One Night, Lost Horizon, Mr. Smith Goes to Washington, Why We Fight, It's a Wonderful Life
Buster Keaton: One Week, Cops, Sherlock, Jr., The Navigator, The General, Steamboat Bill, Jr., The Cameraman
Steven Spielberg: Jaws, Close Encounters of the Third Kind, Raiders of the Lost Ark, E.T.: The Extra-Terrestrial, Jurassic Park, Schindler's List, Saving Private Ryan
George Stevens: Swing Time, Gunga Din, Woman of the Year, George Stevens' World War II footage, A Place in the Sun, Shane, Giant
Billy Wilder: The Lost Weekend, Double Indemnity, Sunset Boulevard, Ace in the Hole, Sabrina, Some Like It Hot, The Apartment
6
Charlie Chaplin: The Immigrant, The Kid, The Gold Rush, City Lights, Modern Times, The Great Dictator
D. W. Griffith: Lady Helen's Escapade, A Corner in Wheat, The Musketeers of Pig Alley, The Birth of a Nation, Intolerance, Broken Blossoms
John Huston: The Maltese Falcon, The Battle of San Pietro, Let There Be Light, The Treasure of the Sierra Madre, The Asphalt Jungle, The African Queen
Wilfred Jackson: Snow White and the Seven Dwarfs (sequence director), The Old Mill, Pinocchio (sequence director), Fantasia, Dumbo (sequence director), Cinderella
Stanley Kubrick: Paths of Glory, Spartacus, Dr. Strangelove, 2001: A Space Odyssey, A Clockwork Orange, The Shining
Vincente Minnelli: Cabin in the Sky, Meet Me in St. Louis, An American in Paris, The Bad and the Beautiful, The Band Wagon, Gigi
King Vidor: The Big Parade, The Crowd, Show People, Hallelujah, Our Daily Bread, The Wizard of Oz (uncredited)
5
William Kennedy Dickson: Newark Athlete, Blacksmith Scene, Edison Kinetographic Record of a Sneeze, The Dickson Experimental Sound Film, Rip Van Winkle
Ernst Lubitsch: Lady Windermere's Fan, Trouble in Paradise, Ninotchka, The Shop Around the Corner, To Be or Not to Be
Sidney Lumet: 12 Angry Men, The Pawnbroker, King: A Filmed Record... Montgomery to Memphis, Dog Day Afternoon, Network
Otto Preminger: Laura, Carmen Jones, The Man with the Golden Arm, Porgy and Bess, Anatomy of a Murder
Martin Scorsese: Mean Streets, Taxi Driver, The Last Waltz, Raging Bull, Goodfellas
Ben Sharpsteen: Snow White and the Seven Dwarfs (sequence director),  Pinocchio (supervising director), Fantasia, Dumbo (supervising director), Cinderella (supervising director)
William Wellman: Wings, The Public Enemy, Wild Boys of the Road, The Ox-Bow Incident, The Story of G.I. Joe
4
Robert Altman: M*A*S*H, McCabe and Mrs. Miller, The Long Goodbye, Nashville
Francis Ford Coppola: The Godfather, The Godfather Part II, The Conversation, Apocalypse Now
Michael Curtiz: The Adventures of Robin Hood, Yankee Doodle Dandy, Casablanca, Mildred Pierce
Stanley Donen: On the Town, Singin' in the Rain, Seven Brides for Seven Brothers, Charade
Spike Lee: She's Gotta Have It, Do the Right Thing, Malcolm X, 4 Little Girls
Mervyn LeRoy: Little Caesar, I Am a Fugitive from a Chain Gang, Gold Diggers of 1933, The House I Live In (uncredited)
Rouben Mamoulian: Applause, Love Me Tonight, Becky Sharp, The Mark of Zorro
Edwin S. Porter: Life of an American Fireman, The Great Train Robbery, Dream of a Rarebit Fiend, Tess of the Storm Country
Preston Sturges: The Lady Eve, Sullivan's Travels, The Miracle of Morgan's Creek, Hail the Conquering Hero
Maurice Tourneur: The Wishing Ring: An Idyll of Old England, The Poor Little Rich Girl, The Blue Bird, The Last of the Mohicans
Josef von Sternberg: It (uncredited), The Last Command, The Docks of New York, Morocco
Raoul Walsh: Regeneration, The Thief of Bagdad, The Big Trail, White Heat
Orson Welles: Citizen Kane, The Magnificent Ambersons, The Lady from Shanghai, Touch of Evil
James Whale: Frankenstein, The Invisible Man, The Bride of Frankenstein, Show Boat
3
James Algar: Fantasia, Bambi (sequence director), The Living Desert
Samuel Armstrong: Fantasia, Dumbo (sequence director), Bambi (sequence director)
Lloyd Bacon: 42nd Street, Footlight Parade, Knute Rockne, All American
Clarence G. Badger: Jubilo, Hands Up!, It
Reginald Barker: The Bargain, The Italian, Civilization
Mel Brooks: The Producers, Blazing Saddles, Young Frankenstein
Clarence Brown: The Last of the Mohicans, Flesh and the Devil, National Velvet
John Cassavetes: Shadows, Faces, A Woman Under the Influence
Edward F. Cline: One Week, Cops, The Bank Dick
Merian C. Cooper: Grass, King Kong, This Is Cinerama
Blake Edwards: Days of Wine and Roses, The Pink Panther, Breakfast at Tiffany's
Norm Ferguson: Pinocchio (sequence director), Fantasia, Dumbo (sequence director)
Dave Fleischer: Snow White, Popeye the Sailor Meets Sindbad the Sailor, Let's All Go to the Lobby (uncredited)
Victor Fleming: Red Dust, Gone with the Wind, The Wizard of Oz
Samuel Fuller: V-E+1, Pickup on South Street, Shock Corridor
Clyde Geronimi: Bambi (sequence director; uncredited), Cinderella, Sleeping Beauty (supervising director)
David Hand: Snow White and the Seven Dwarfs (supervising director), Fantasia, Bambi (supervising director)
Chuck Jones: Duck Amuck, One Froggy Evening, What's Opera, Doc?
Henry King: Tol'able David, State Fair, Twelve O'Clock High
Jack Kinney: Pinocchio (sequence director), Dumbo (sequence director), The Story of Menstruation (uncredited)
John Landis: National Lampoon's Animal House, The Blues Brothers, Michael Jackson's Thriller
John Lasseter: Luxo Jr., Tin Toy, Toy Story
George Lucas: Electronic Labyrinth: THX 1138 4EB, American Graffiti, Star Wars
Hamilton Luske: Pinocchio (supervising director), Fantasia, Cinderella
Winsor McCay: Little Nemo, Gertie the Dinosaur, The Sinking of the Lusitania
Lewis Milestone: All Quiet on the Western Front, The Front Page, A Walk in the Sun
Dudley Murphy: St. Louis Blues, Black and Tan, The Emperor Jones
Nicholas Ray: In a Lonely Place, Johnny Guitar, Rebel Without a Cause
Rob Reiner: This Is Spinal Tap, The Princess Bride, When Harry Met Sally...
Martin Ritt: Hud, Sounder, Norma Rae
Bill Roberts: Fantasia, Dumbo (sequence director), Bambi (sequence director)
Ridley Scott: Alien, Blade Runner, Thelma & Louise
Luis Valdez: I Am Joaquín, Zoot Suit, La Bamba
W. S. Van Dyke: The Thin Man, Naughty Marietta, The Prisoner of Zenda (uncredited)
Erich von Stroheim: Foolish Wives, Greed, The Wedding March
Lois Weber: Suspense, Where Are My Children? (uncredited), Shoes
Robert Wise: The Day the Earth Stood Still, West Side Story, The Sound of Music
Frederick Wiseman: Titicut Follies, High School, Hospital
Robert Zemeckis: Back to the Future, Who Framed Roger Rabbit, Forrest Gump
Fred Zinnemann: High Noon, From Here to Eternity, Oklahoma!
2
Robert Aldrich: Kiss Me Deadly, What Ever Happened to Baby Jane?
Woody Allen: Annie Hall, Manhattan
Kenneth Anger: Eaux d'Artifice, Scorpio Rising
Hal Ashby: Harold and Maude, Being There
Billy Bitzer: Westinghouse Works, 1904, Interior New York Subway, 14th Street to 42nd Street
Les Blank: Chulas Fronteras, Garlic Is as Good as Ten Mothers
John Boorman: Point Blank, Deliverance
Frank Borzage: Humoresque, Seventh Heaven
Richard Brooks: Blackboard Jungle, In Cold Blood
Tod Browning: Dracula, Freaks
Clyde Bruckman: The General, The Battle of the Century
Charles Burnett: Killer of Sheep, To Sleep with Anger
James Cameron: The Terminator, Titanic
Shirley Clarke: The Cool World, Portrait of Jason
Joel and Ethan Coen: Fargo, The Big Lebowski
Julie Dash: Illusions, Daughters of the Dust
Cecil B. DeMille: The Cheat, The Ten Commandments
Jonathan Demme: Stop Making Sense, The Silence of the Lambs
Richard Donner: Superman, The Goonies
Clint Eastwood: The Outlaw Josey Wales, Unforgiven
Rob Epstein: Word Is Out: Stories of Some of Our Lives, The Times of Harvey Milk
Robert J. Flaherty: Nanook of the North, Louisiana Story
Robert Florey: The Life and Death of 9413: a Hollywood Extra, Daughter of Shanghai
Miloš Forman: One Flew Over the Cuckoo's Nest, Amadeus
Bob Fosse: Cabaret, All That Jazz
John Frankenheimer: The Manchurian Candidate, Seconds
William Friedkin: The French Connection, The Exorcist
Robert Gardner: The Hunters, Dead Birds
Louis J. Gasnier: The Perils of Pauline, The Exploits of Elaine
Burt Gillett: Flowers and Trees, Three Little Pigs
Michael Gordon: Cyrano de Bergerac, Pillow Talk
Alfred E. Green: Ella Cinders, Baby Face
T. Hee: Pinocchio (sequence director), Fantasia
George Roy Hill: Butch Cassidy and the Sundance Kid, The Sting
William K. Howard: The Power and the Glory, Knute Rockne, All American (uncredited)
John Hubley: Gerald McBoing-Boing (supervising director), The Hole
John Hughes: The Breakfast Club, Ferris Bueller's Day Off
Gene Kelly: On the Town, Singin' in the Rain
Jim Klein: Growing Up Female, Union Maids
Randal Kleiser: Peege, Grease
Stanley Kramer: Judgment at Nuremberg, Guess Who's Coming to Dinner
Gregory La Cava: So's Your Old Man, My Man Godfrey
Fritz Lang: Fury, The Big Heat
David Lean: The Bridge on the River Kwai, Lawrence of Arabia
Pare Lorentz: The Plow That Broke the Plains, The River
Ida Lupino: Outrage, The Hitch-Hiker
Terrence Malick: Badlands, Days of Heaven
Joseph L. Mankiewicz: All About Eve, King: A Filmed Record... Montgomery to Memphis
Anthony Mann: Winchester '73, The Naked Spur
George Marshall: Destry Rides Again, How the West Was Won
Albert and David Maysles: Salesman, Grey Gardens
Oscar Micheaux: Within Our Gates, Body and Soul
Errol Morris: The Thin Blue Line, The Fog of War
F. W. Murnau: Sunrise, Tabu: A Story of the South Seas
Gregory Nava: El Norte, Selena
Fred C. Newmeyer: Safety Last!, The Freshman
Fred Niblo: The Mark of Zorro, Ben-Hur
Mike Nichols: Who's Afraid of Virginia Woolf?, The Graduate
Christopher Nolan: Memento, The Dark Knight
George Pal: Tulips Shall Grow, John Henry and the Inky-Poo
Gordon Parks: The Learning Tree, Shaft
Sam Peckinpah: Ride the High Country, The Wild Bunch
Arthur Penn: Bonnie and Clyde, Little Big Man
D. A. Pennebaker: Dont Look Back, Monterey Pop
Roman Polanski: Rosemary's Baby, Chinatown
Julia Reichert: Growing Up Female, Union Maids
Robert Rossen: All the King's Men, The Hustler
Denis Sanders: A Time Out of War, Czechoslovakia 1968
Paul Satterfield: Fantasia, Bambi (sequence director)
Franklin J. Schaffner: Planet of the Apes, Patton
Ernest B. Schoedsack: Grass, King Kong
Edward Sedgwick: The Phantom of the Opera (uncredited), The Cameraman
George B. Seitz: The Exploits of Elaine, Love Finds Andy Hardy
Don Siegel: Invasion of the Body Snatchers, Dirty Harry
Douglas Sirk: All That Heaven Allows, Imitation of Life
Victor Sjöström: He Who Gets Slapped, The Wind
Phillips Smalley: Suspense, Where Are My Children? (uncredited)
John M. Stahl: Imitation of Life, Leave Her to Heaven
Ralph Steiner: H2O, The City
Robert Stevenson: Old Yeller, Mary Poppins
Mel Stuart: Willy Wonka & the Chocolate Factory, Wattstax
John Sturges: Bad Day at Black Rock, The Magnificent Seven
Frank Tashlin: The Way of Peace, Will Success Spoil Rock Hunter?
Sam Taylor: Safety Last!, The Freshman
Jacques Tourneur: Cat People, Out of the Past
Wayne Wang: Chan Is Missing, The Joy Luck Club
John Waters: Pink Flamingos, Hairspray
Fred M. Wilcox: Lassie Come Home, Forbidden Planet

See also

 National Recording Registry
 These Amazing Shadows, a 2011 documentary film that tells the history and importance of the registry

References

External links
 Complete National Film Registry Listing
 National Film Registry homepage
 Classic Movie Hub: National Film Registry List

1988 establishments in the United States
1988 in American cinema
Cultural infrastructure completed in 1988
Film archives in the United States
History of film
Library of Congress
Reference material lists
Film preservation